Itagi  is a village in the southern state of Karnataka, India. It is located in the Khanapur taluk of Belgaum district in Karnataka.

History 
Itagi is the site of Narayan Swami temple. This temple was built in the 12th century and houses a tall Narayan Swami statue. Itagi is related to the history of Channamma kittur.  In history of kittur it is one of the main business centre of locals and British. Britishers held one treasury office also, Rayanna and his followers took that. Itagi has a lake, Itagi Lake, which is 56 acres in area. Itagi also has the oldest Demmavva or Gramdevi temple and shri Kalameshwar temples. A Paraswanath Jain temple was constructed in the recent past and this temple is totally constructed in stone. It has two masjids.  It is a village in which people from all religions – Hindu, Muslim, and Jain live together in harmony. A freedom fighter B. M. Sanikop, also an MLA, was from Itagi.

Demographics
 India census, Itagi had a population of 8331 with 4223 males and 4108 females.
It is a fast-developing village.  It is the biggest Gram Panchayat village in Belgaum.

See also
 Belgaum
 Districts of Karnataka

References

External links
 http://Belgaum.nic.in/

Villages in Belagavi district